Peter William May (born 1943/44) is an American businessman and investor.

Biography
May was born to a Jewish family and raised in Hewlett, New York on Long Island, the son of Isabel and Samuel May. His father was a businessman and his mother a social worker. He has one sister, Linda. He graduated with a B.A. and later an M.B.A. from the University of Chicago after which he worked for the accounting firm Peat Marwick. In 1972, he joined 
the Flagstaff Corp founded by Nelson Peltz as an accountant and later became its chief financial officer. In the 1980s, May and Peltz partnered together and founded the investment firm Triarc Companies where May served as president and chief operating officer. In April 1983, the Peltz and May bought a stake in vending-machine and wire company Triangle Industries Inc. with the idea of using it to make acquisitions, building it into a Fortune 100 industrial company.  Triangle was sold to Pechiney in 1988.
 
In 1989, May joined the board of directors at Mount Sinai Medical Center; in 2002, he was named chairman of the board after being asked by former U.S. Secretary of the Treasury and then fellow board member Robert Rubin. He was able to restore Mount Sinai to profitability in three years without utilizing its $180 million in unrestricted funds while also increasing its endowment by $70 million to $500 million.

Personal life
In 1964, May married Leni Ann Finkelstein. They have a son, Jonathan Paul May (married to Juliana Kelly in 1990). The couple lives in Bridgewater, Connecticut.

References

Year of birth missing (living people)
Living people
American business executives
20th-century American Jews
American accountants
1940s births
University of Chicago alumni
People from Hewlett, New York
People from Bridgewater, Connecticut
21st-century American Jews